K19 pipe is a diatreme in the southwestern part of the Buffalo Head Hills kimberlite field in Northern Alberta, Canada. It is thought to have formed about 60 million years ago, making it one of the youngest volcanic formations in the Buffalo Head Hills kimberlite field and in Alberta. Unlike many other diatremes in the Buffalo Head Hills kimberlite field, it contains low diamond content.

See also
List of volcanoes in Canada
Volcanism of Canada
Volcanism of Western Canada

References

Buffalo Head Hills kimberlite field